The Spam Act 2003 (Cth) is an Act passed by the Australian Parliament in 2003 to regulate commercial e-mail and other types of commercial electronic messages. The Act restricts spam, especially e-mail spam and some types of phone spam, as well as e-mail address harvesting. However, there are broad exemptions.

The first portions of the Act came into effect on 12 December 2003, the day the act received Royal Assent, with the remaining sections of the Act coming into force on 10 April 2004. The Act was originally enforced by the Australian Communications Authority, which in 2005 merged into the Australian Communications and Media Authority (ACMA).

Outline 

The key points of the Act provide that:

 Unsolicited commercial electronic messages must not be sent unless it is a designated commercial electronic message defined at Schedule 1 of the Act.
 Commercial electronic messages must include information about the individual or organisation who authorised the sending of the message.
 Commercial electronic messages must contain a functional unsubscribe facility.
 Address‑harvesting software must not be supplied, acquired or used.
 An electronic address list produced using address‑harvesting software must not be supplied, acquired or used.
 The main remedies for breaches of the Act are civil penalties and injunctions.

Significant cases

Australian Communications Authority v Clarity1 (2006)

In ACA v Clarity1 (2006), Justice Robert Nicholson considered the respondent's key defence, being retrospective application of provisions under the Act relating to the acquisition and use of harvested address lists. He noted specifically that lists gathered or acquired prior to the Act coming into force are still subject to the legislation. He also struck out the respondent's defence that it had obtained consent to use the gathered addresses for the defined purpose, and also noted a lack of compliance with the provisions of the Act requiring the provision of a functional unsubscribe facility.

 Case Information at the Federal Court of Australia (File WAD155/2005)

References

External links 

 DCITA spam home
 ACMA spam home
 Information about the spam laws from the EFA
 Federal Register of Legislation

2003 in Australian law
Acts of the Parliament of Australia
Computing legislation
Spamming